The Baeksang Arts Award for Best Director – Film is annually presented at the Baeksang Arts Awards ceremony.

List of winners

References

Sources

External links 
  

Baeksang Arts Awards (film)
Awards for best director